Phyllocyclus is a genus of flowering plants belonging to the family Gentianaceae.

Its native range is Southern China to Indo-China.

Species:

Phyllocyclus helferianus 
Phyllocyclus lucidissimus 
Phyllocyclus minutiflorus 
Phyllocyclus parishii 
Phyllocyclus petelotii

References

Gentianaceae
Gentianaceae genera